Kuntur Wasi (Quechua kuntur condor, wasi house, "condor house") is a  mountain in the Andes of Bolivia. It is situated in the Potosí Department, Sud Lípez Province, San Pablo de Lípez Municipality. Kuntur Wasi lies north of the Lluch'a Mayu (Llucha Mayu) east of San Pablo de Lípez.

References 

Mountains of Potosí Department